The Oklahoma State Cowboys basketball team represents Oklahoma State University in Stillwater, Oklahoma, United States in NCAA Division I men's basketball competition. All women's teams at the school are known as Cowgirls. The Cowboys currently compete in the Big 12 Conference. In 2020, CBS Sports ranked Oklahoma State the 25th best college basketball program of all-time, ahead of such programs as Oklahoma and Texas. Oklahoma State men’s basketball has a very rich history of success, having won more national titles and advanced to the NCAA Championship, Final Four, Elite Eight and Sweet Sixteen more times than any Big 12 program other than Kansas. Oklahoma State has won a combined 23 regular season conference titles and conference tournament titles, which is the most of any program in the state of Oklahoma. NBA greats from Oklahoma State include Cade Cunningham (the number One overall pick in the 2021 NBA Draft), Tony Allen (whose number was retired by the Memphis Grizzlies), John Starks (all-time leader in three pointers in New York Knicks history), Desmond Mason (2001 NBA Slam Dunk Champion) and Marcus Smart (2022 NBA Defensive Player of the Year, 2x NBA All-Defensive First Team). Several people associated with the program in some form have been inducted into the Naismith Memorial Basketball Hall of Fame. Eddie Sutton, who was inducted as a coach, is both a former player and former coach for the program. Don Haskins and Bill Self are former Cowboys players inducted as coaches for other programs. Bob Kurland was inducted as a player and Hank Iba was inducted as a coach at Oklahoma State

Since 1938, the team has played its home games in Gallagher-Iba Arena. Prior to 1957, the school was known as Oklahoma A&M College, and the teams were nicknamed the Aggies.

On March 21, 2016, Brad Underwood was hired as head coach at Oklahoma State, replacing the fired Travis Ford. Just short of one year, on March 18, 2017, Underwood left the program for Illinois. Assistant Mike Boynton was promoted to head coach on March 24.

History

Oklahoma State University (then Oklahoma A&M College) began varsity intercollegiate competition in men's basketball in 1908. The Cowboys (including the predecessor Aggies teams) rank 35th in total victories among all NCAA Division I college basketball programs, with an all-time win–loss record of 1517–1053 (.590) at the end of 2010–11 season.

The Cowboys (including the predecessor Aggies teams) have made 28 total appearances in the NCAA tournament (37–21 overall record), reaching the NCAA Final Four six times (1945, 1946, 1949, 1951, 1995, 2004) and the NCAA regional finals (Elite Eight) eleven times. Oklahoma State (then Oklahoma A&M College) won the NCAA Championship in 1945 and 1946. The Cowboys rank tenth (tied with three other programs) in all-time Final Four appearances and seventh (tied with seven others) in total NCAA Championships.

The early years (1907–34)

Under nine head coaches in this period Oklahoma A&M found very little success, with only six winning seasons. Very little success was found early on and after a six-win 15-loss season under first-year coach John Maulbetsch things were not looking well. However, in the next three seasons Maulbetsch turned around the program, leading the Aggies to a 41–20 record culminating with a first-place finish in their last season in the Southwest Conference. The move to the Missouri Valley Conference in 1925 would halt the progress under this budding coach. After Maulbetsch resigned from the positions of football, baseball and basketball coach the Aggies would not have another winning season until Henry Iba took the reins in 1934. However, despite an overall record of 7–9, the Aggies did win the Missouri Valley Conference Co-Championship in 1930-31 under Coach George E. Rody with a conference record of 5–3.

This period in Oklahoma State basketball history was marked with mainly football coaches heading the football, baseball and basketball teams.

Henry Iba era (1934–70)

Henry Iba came to Oklahoma A&M College in 1934 and remained for 36 years. He retired after the 1969–70 season. For most of his tenure at A&M/OSU, he doubled as athletic director.

Iba's teams were methodical, ball-controlling units that featured weaving patterns and low scoring games.  Iba's "swinging gate" defense (a man-to-man with team flow) was applauded by many, and is still effective in today's game. He was known as "the Iron Duke of Defense".

Iba's Aggies became the first to win consecutive NCAA titles (1945 and 1946). His 1945–46 NCAA champions were led by Bob Kurland, the game's first seven-foot player. They beat NYU in the 1945 finals and North Carolina in the 1946 finals. He was voted coach of the year in both seasons. His 1945 champions also defeated National Invitation Tournament champion, DePaul, and 6' 9" center George Mikan in a classic Red Cross Benefit game. Iba's 1949 and 1951 teams also reached the Final Four of the NCAA Tournament.

Oklahoma A&M/Oklahoma State teams won 655 games, 14 Missouri Valley Championships, and one Big Eight Championship, in 36 seasons with Iba as head men's basketball coach.

"Mr. Iba," as he is still popularly known at OSU, remained a fixture on campus until his death in 1993, often giving advice to players during practice.  One seat in the southeast concourse level of Gallagher-Iba Arena (which was renamed in his honor in 1987) remains unused in his honor.

1970–90
The mostly subpar results of Iba's final decade in Stillwater largely remained the status quo for Oklahoma State during the two decades following his retirement. From the 1970–71 to 1989–90 seasons, the Cowboys finished with winning records only six times, finished in the top half of the Big Eight Conference standings only three times, and earned a berth in the NCAA tournament only once.

Eddie Sutton era (1990–2006)
After being an assistant for the Cowboys in 1958–59, Eddie Sutton returned to Oklahoma State in 1990 to coach. In the years leading up to his hiring, the team had made postseason play only three times since joining the Big Eight Conference in 1957.

The Pokes began to turn around almost immediately with Sutton's presence, and in 1991, Oklahoma State returned to the NCAA Tournament, winning their first NCAA Tournament game since making the Elite Eight in 1965. Sutton’s Cowboys advanced all the way to the Sweet Sixteen during his first two seasons. In 1995, the Pokes, under the leadership of Bryant "Big Country" Reeves and Randy Rutherford, captured the Big Eight Conference Tournament and won a bid to the 1995 NCAA Division I men's basketball tournament. They advanced to the Final Four in Seattle, Washington, where they lost to eventual champion UCLA. It was the Cowboys' deepest advance in the tournament since 1951.

Led by John Lucas III, Joey Graham, and 2004 Big 12 Player of the Year Tony Allen, Sutton's 2003–04 team finished with a school-record 31 wins (31–4), won both the Big 12 regular season and tournament championships, and advanced to the Final Four as a No. 2 seed in the 2004 NCAA tournament. The Cowboys finished the season ranked No. 4 in the final AP poll and Coaches' Poll.

In his 16 seasons in Stillwater, the Cowboys reached the postseason 15 times (having declined an NIT bid in Sutton's sixth season as head coach), including 13 NCAA Tournament bids and two Final Four appearances. They also captured three regular-season conference titles and three conference tournament championships. Sutton finished his career at OSU as the second-winningest coach in school history, behind only his mentor, Iba.

2001 plane crash

On January 27, 2001, one of three planes carrying Oklahoma State staff and players crashed in a snow storm near Byers, Colorado, killing all 10 on board.  The plane was on its way back from a loss against the University of Colorado.  Those killed included Nate Fleming, a redshirt freshman guard; Dan Lawson, a junior guard; Bill Teegins, radio sportscaster of OSU basketball and sports anchor on CBS affiliate KWTV-9 in Oklahoma City; Kendall Durfey, television and radio engineer; Will Hancock, media relations coordinator; Pat Noyes, director of basketball operations; Brian Luinstra, athletic trainer; Jared Weiberg, student assistant; Denver Mills, pilot; and Bjorn Falistrom, co-pilot.

Since 2007, Oklahoma State has honored these ten during an annual 5k and 10K race called the Remember the Ten Run.

Sean Sutton era (2006–08)
Eddie Sutton's son, Sean Sutton, also a former Cowboy player, took over head coaching duties in 2006. Following a record of 39–29 during his first two seasons, Sutton resigned under pressure after a March 31, 2008, meeting with Athletic Director Mike Holder.

Travis Ford era (2008–16)
On April 16, 2008, Travis Ford was hired as the 18th men's basketball head coach at Oklahoma State. He resigned from the same position with the UMass Minutemen to take the position. At the time of his hiring, he had a Division I coaching record of 123–115. Ford also coached at Eastern Kentucky and Campbellsville University (NAIA). As a player, he was coached by Norm Stewart at the University of Missouri as a freshman. He transferred after his freshman season and played for three years (1992–94) at the University of Kentucky under Rick Pitino.

Ford was fired on March 18, 2016 after a season in which the Cowboys went 3–15 in Big 12 play and 12–20 overall. Although he led the Cowboys to five NCAA tournaments in his eight seasons in charge, he never finished higher than third in conference play, and finished sixth or worse in the Big 12 seven times.

Brad Underwood era (2016–2017)
Three days after Ford's firing, Oklahoma State hired Brad Underwood from Stephen F. Austin State University (SFA). He began his coaching career at Kansas State, first serving as director of basketball operations for a season and then serving as an assistant for five more. Underwood then went to South Carolina as an assistant for a season before being hired to his first head coaching post at SFA. During his three seasons in charge, the Lumberjacks went 89–14 overall and 53–1 in Southland Conference regular-season play, making the NCAA tournament all three seasons and advancing to the second round twice. Underwood's 89 wins tie him with Brad Stevens for the most wins by a men's basketball head coach in his first three seasons at an NCAA school. He is also the first coach to be named Southland Conference Coach of the Year three consecutive times. On March 18, 2017 Brad Underwood was hired at Illinois. During the 2016-17 season, Associate head coach Lamont Evans was engaged in bribery scheme that came to light in 2017. Evans was sentenced to three months in prison in June 2019 for his participation in the scheme, which he also conducted at the University of South Carolina. In June 2020 press release, the NCAA announced a postseason ban for 2020–21.

Mike Boynton era (2017–present)
The school promoted assistant coach Mike Boynton Jr. to head coach on March 24.

Postseason

NCAA tournament results
The Cowboys have appeared in the NCAA tournament 29 times. Their combined record is 39–28. They won the tournament in 1945 and 1946.

NIT results
The Cowboys have appeared in the National Invitation Tournament (NIT) 13 times. Their combined record is 11–13.

Facilities

Gallagher-Iba Arena

Gallagher-Iba Arena, once dubbed “Madison Square Garden of the Plains”, is the basketball and wrestling venue at Oklahoma State University in Stillwater, Oklahoma. Originally completed in 1938 and named the 4-H Club and Student Activities Building, it was soon renamed Gallagher Hall to honor wrestling coach, Ed Gallagher. After renovations in 1987, the name became Gallagher-Iba Arena, as a tribute to longtime basketball coach and innovator, Henry Iba. Gallagher-Iba Arena was named the best college gymnasium by CBS SportsLine.com in August 2001.

The first basketball game was played on December 9, 1938, when Iba's Oklahoma A&M Aggies beat Phog Allen’s Kansas Jayhawks, 21–15, in a battle between two of the nation's early basketball powers. In its original configuration, seating was limited to 6,381. Though small by today's standards, it was the largest collegiate facility in the country when completed. The original maple floor, still in use today, was the most expensive of its kind in America when it was installed in 1938.

Oklahoma State completed a $55 million expansion of Gallagher-Iba Arena prior to the 1999–2000 Cowboy basketball season. Rather than build a new, off-campus arena to accommodate the need for additional seating, the decision was made to expand Gallagher-Iba Arena itself to more than double its original capacity (from its 6,381-seat capacity to its current 13,611 seats). The old sightlines and the original white maple floor were kept (it remains the oldest original basketball court floor still in use).

On January 15, 2005, the court was officially named after Eddie Sutton as Eddie Sutton Court.

Notable players

Anthony Hickey (born 1992), basketball player for Hapoel Haifa in the Israeli Basketball Premier League

References

External links